State Route 49 (SR 49) is a state highway in Tennessee. The route forms a broad southern arc that passes through the rural Middle Tennessee towns of Dover, Erin, Charlotte, Ashland City, Pleasant View, and Springfield.

Route description

SR 49 begins in Stewart County in downtown Dover at a junction with US 79/SR 76 as a primary highway. It goes east, paralleling the Cumberland River before turning south and having an intersection with SR 233. It then goes through some farmland and hills before crossing into Houston County.

SR 49 then immediately enters Tennessee Ridge and comes to an intersection with SR 147, where SR 49 turns east again towards Erin. SR 49 then enters Erin shortly afterwards, going straight through downtown before having an intersection with SR 149. It then intersects with SR 13 not even a half a mile later. It then goes through some more hills and farmland, having an intersection and concurrency with SR 46 before crossing into Dickson County.

SR 49 then goes through some more hills before having an intersection and becoming concurrent with SR 235 and entering Vanleer. They then go through Vanleer, turning to the south temporarily then turning east again, before SR 235 breaks off and goes south, and SR 49 continues east. SR 49 then goes through more hills and farmland before entering Charlotte and having an intersection and short concurrency with SR 48, just north of its intersection with SR 47. SR 49 then goes through downtown and intersects Old State Hwy. 47, an old alignment of SR 47, before leaving Charlotte and becoming very curvy, going northeast.

It then enters Cheatham County and has a crossing of the Harpeth River before intersecting SR 250 and begins paralleling the Cumberland River again, becomes concurrent with SR 249, crosses the Cumberland River, and enters Ashland City. SR 49/SR 249 then intersect with SR 455 (Tennessee Waltz Parkway/Ashland City Bypass), a bypass for SR 12, before entering downtown and having an intersection and short concurrency with SR 12. SR 249 then separates and goes east and SR 49 turns north. SR 49 then enters Pleasant View and intersects US 41A/SR 112 before having an interchange with I-24 and crossing into Robertson County.

It then goes northeast to Coopertown where it intersects SR 257. SR 49 then goes through some farmland before entering Springfield. It then enters downtown and comes to an intersection with US 41/US 431/SR 11/SR 65/SR 76, with SR 76 becoming concurrent with SR 49. SR 76 then separates and turns east while SR 49 leaves Springfield and continues northeast. It then intersects and has a short concurrency with SR 25 before becoming a secondary highway and going through some more farmland. It then becomes curvy before entering Orlinda and intersecting SR 52 in the center of town. SR 49 then continues north to the Kentucky state line, where it continues as KY 383.

History
Until the 2000s, SR 49 extended north on The Trace Road to the Kentucky border. Sometime in the 2000s, this portion was redesignated as SR 461. Google Maps still displays SR 461 as SR 49.

Future
Currently, a project to modify the intersection with SR 25 east of Springfield is underway. The project is projected to be completed by the end of 2021.

Major intersections

See also

References

External links

 Roads of the Mid-South & West: Tennessee State Route 49

049
Transportation in Stewart County, Tennessee
Transportation in Houston County, Tennessee
Transportation in Dickson County, Tennessee
Transportation in Cheatham County, Tennessee
Transportation in Robertson County, Tennessee